Paraburkholderia sacchari is a species of bacteria in the phylum Pseudomonadota. It was isolated in the 1990s from sugarcane crop soil (São Paulo state, Brazil), and later identified as a new bacterial species, originally named as Burkholderia sacchari. Paraburkholderia sacchari was found to be capable of creating and accumulating polyhydroxyalkanoates (PHA) by incorporating different monomers. This strain was subject of a number of genetic and bioproccess engineering studies conducted worldwide aiming to establish PHA production from different substrates, especially using agro-industrial byproducts.

References

External links
sgmjournals.org Burkholderia sacchari sp. nov., a polyhydroxyalkanoate-accumulating bacterium isolated from soil of a sugar-cane plantation in Brazil

sacchari
Bacteria described in 2001